Magnolia Park Transit Center is a light rail and bus station in Houston, Texas on the METRORail system. It is the eastern terminus of the Green Line and is located on Harrisburg Boulevard at 70th Street in Magnolia Park, in the East End.

The light rail station opened on January 11, 2017 as part of the Green Line's second phase, extending it east from its initial terminus at Altic/Howard Hughes station.

Bus routes

20: Canal/Memorial
28: OST–Wayside
38: Manchester–Lawndale
50: Broadway to  Hobby Airport
76: Evergreen

References

METRORail stations
Railway stations in the United States opened in 2017
2017 establishments in Texas
Railway stations in Harris County, Texas